Diane et Endymion (Diana and Endymion) is a French-language opera by the composer Niccolò Piccinni, first performed at the Académie Royale de Musique, Paris (the Paris Opera) on 7 September 1784. It takes the form of an opéra (tragédie lyrique) in three acts. The libretto, by Jean-François Espic Chevalier de Liroux, is based on the story of the goddess Diana's love for the shepherd Endymion.

Sources
  Félix Clément and Pierre Larousse Dictionnaire des Opéras, p. 212.

1784 operas
Operas
French-language operas
Operas by Niccolò Piccinni
Tragédies en musique
Operas based on classical mythology